Tannuella is a genus of helcionellids known from Lower Cambrian strata.

It has a high, septate shell similar to that of hypseloconids such as Knightoconus .  These genera were once considered ancestral cephalopods, but are more broadly assigned to the helconellids (or putatively the tergomyans); i.e. "Cambrian monoplacophora".

References

Helcionellidae
Prehistoric cephalopod genera
Cambrian molluscs
Paleozoic invertebrates of Oceania
Paleozoic animals of Asia